Old Gorhambury House located near St Albans, Hertfordshire, England, is a ruined Elizabethan mansion, a leading and early example of the Elizabethan  prodigy house.

History

The old house
It was built in 1563–68 by Sir Nicholas Bacon, Lord Keeper, and was visited a number of times by Queen Elizabeth I. It is a Grade I listed building.  

The house was built partly from bricks taken from the old Abbey buildings at St Albans, then in process of demolition following the Benedictine priory's dissolution some 25 years earlier. It was used as a residence by his youngest son, the polymath (scientist, philosopher, statesman and essayist) Sir Francis Bacon, before being bequeathed by him to his former secretary, Sir Thomas Meautys, who married Anne Bacon, the great-granddaughter of Sir Nicholas.

The estate passed in 1652 to Anne's second husband Sir Harbottle Grimston, Master of the Rolls and Speaker in the Convention Parliament of 1660. The estate is owned by the Grimston family to the present day, having been passed via Harbottle Grimston's son Samuel, who died childless in 1700, to his great-nephew William Luckyn, who in turn became the first Viscount Grimston in 1719.

The house fell into ruin after the construction of New Gorhambury House in the 18th century, but was retained as a feature within landscaped parkland. The surviving remains include a two-storey porch, chapel and clock tower.

The new house

In the years 1777–84, the current Palladian-style Gorhambury House was built nearby. Designed by Sir Robert Taylor and commissioned by James Bucknall Grimston, 3rd Viscount Grimston, it replaced Old Gorhambury House. It remains the home of the Earl of Verulam.

The current house is a member of Historic Houses and is open for tours at certain times.

Garden 
The "pondyards", the remains of water garden near the River Ver, were scheduled in 2020 under the Ancient Monuments and Archaeological Areas Act 1979. The feature was laid out in the 17th century for Sir Francis Bacon, possibly adapting preexisting ponds.

Access 
The site is maintained by English Heritage and is free to visit.

References

External links 

Old Gorhambury - Official Webpage
 Old Gorhambury House - English Heritage webpage
Photographs of Old Gorhambury House
A Guide to Old Hertfordshire webpage on Gorhambury
Webpage regarding Old Gorhambury House on Sir Francis Bacon's New Advancement of Learning website, including anecdotes about the young Francis Bacon's conversations with Queen Elizabeth
The Gorhambury Estate & Leverstock Green
Gorhambury House - Historic Houses Association, information on visits
Tour UK webpage for the current Gorhambury House

Houses completed in 1568
Gorhambury House
English Heritage sites in Hertfordshire
Grade I listed buildings in Hertfordshire
Ruins in Hertfordshire
Scheduled monuments in Hertfordshire
1568 establishments in England